The following is a list of notable British Somalis.

Entertainment
Poly Styrene, musician (father was Somali)
Maya Jama, radio presenter
Chunkz, YouTube personality
Prince Abdi, stand-up comedian
 Aar Maanta, singer-songwriter
Hudeydi, musician

Politics
Abdulrahim Abby Farah, Welsh born diplomat
Hibaq Jama, Labour ward councillor for Lawrence Hill 
Mohamed Mohamud Ibrahim, Deputy Foreign Minister of Somalia (formerly lived in Harlesden)
Magid Magid, Green Party politician; former Lord Mayor of Sheffield (2018-2019) and MEP for Yorkshire and the Humber (2019-2020)
 Sir Mark Hendrick, Labour MP for Preston (2000-present)

Business
Abdirashid Duale, CEO of Dahabshiil

Fashion
Samira Hashi, model and activist

Media
Mohamoud Sheikh Dalmar, journalist
Mo Ali, film director
Rageh Omaar, journalist and writer

Activism
Adam Matan OBE, activist
Nimco Ali, activist
Hanan Ibrahim, activist
Leyla Hussein, psychotherapist
Amal Azzudin, activist

Writing
Nadifa Mohamed, novelist
Hirsi Magan Isse, scholar
Hibo Wardere, author
Warsan Shire, writer and poet
Diriye Osman, writer and artist

Sport
Abdi Jama, basketballer
Ramla Ali, boxer
Mukhtar Mohammed, runner
Jawahir Roble, referee
Ibrahim Farah, footballer
Leon Osman, footballer, 
Mukhtar Ali, footballer
Mo Farah, runner
Islam Feruz, footballer

Other
Ramzi Mohammed, criminal
Muhaydin Mire, criminal
Hussain Bisad, former world's tallest person - current largest hands
Mahmood Hussein Mattan, sailor

See also
 List of British Bangladeshis
 List of British Pakistanis

References

Somalian diaspora in the United Kingdom